Charles Yorke PC (30 December 172220 January 1770) was briefly Lord High Chancellor of Great Britain. His father was also Lord Chancellor, and he began his career as a Member of Parliament. He served successively as Solicitor-General and Attorney-General for several governments, during which he was best known for writing what became the Quebec Act. He was appointed Lord Chancellor over his objections, but he committed suicide only three days after taking the post.

Life
The second son of Philip Yorke, 1st Earl of Hardwicke, he was born in London, and was educated at Corpus Christi College, Cambridge. His literary abilities were shown at an early age by his collaboration with his brother Philip in the Athenian Letters. In 1745 he published an able treatise on the law of forfeiture for high treason, in defence of the severe sentences his father had given to the Scottish Jacobite peers following the Battle of Culloden. In the following year he was called to the bar.

His father being at this time Lord Chancellor, Yorke obtained a sinecure appointment in the Court of Chancery in 1747, and entered Parliament as member for Reigate, a seat which he afterwards exchanged for that for the University of Cambridge. He quickly made his mark in the House of Commons, one of his earliest speeches being in favour of his father's reform of the marriage law that led to the Marriage Act 1753. In 1750 he was elected a Fellow of the Royal Society.

In 1751 he became counsel to the East India Company, and in 1756 he was appointed Solicitor-General, a place which he retained in the administration of the elder Pitt, of whose foreign policy he was a powerful defender.

He resigned with Pitt in 1761, but in 1762 became Attorney-General under Lord Bute. He continued to hold this office when George Grenville became Prime Minister (April 1763), and advised the government on the question raised by John Wilkes's The North Briton. Yorke refused to describe the libel as treasonable, while pronouncing it a high misdemeanour. In the following November he resigned office. Resisting Pitt's attempt to draw him into alliance against the ministry he had quit, Yorke maintained, in a speech that extorted the highest eulogy from Horace Walpole, that parliamentary privilege did not extend to cases of libel; though he agreed with Pitt in condemning the principle of general warrants. Yorke, henceforward a member of the Rockingham party, was elected recorder of Dover in 1764, and in 1765 he again became Attorney-General in the Rockingham administration, whose policy he did much to shape. He supported the repeal of the Stamp Act, while urging the simultaneous passing of the Declaratory Act. His most important measure was the constitution which he drew up for the province of Quebec, and which after his resignation of office became the Quebec Act of 1774.

On the accession to power of Chatham and Grafton in 1766, Yorke resigned office, and took little part in the debates in parliament during the next four years. In 1770 he was invited by the Duke of Grafton, when Camden was dismissed from the Chancellorship, to take his seat on the woolsack. He had, however, explicitly pledged himself to Rockingham and his party not to take office with Grafton. The King exerted all his personal influence to overcome Yorke's scruples, warning him finally that the Great Seal if now refused would never again be within his grasp. Yorke yielded to the King's entreaty, and he was appointed Lord Chancellor and sworn of the Privy Council on 17 January 1770,. He went to his brother's house, where he met the leaders of the Opposition, and feeling at once overwhelmed with shame, fled to his own house, where three days later he committed suicide (20 January 1770). The patent raising him to the peerage as Baron Morden had been made out, but his last act was to refuse his sanction to the sealing of the document.

Family

Charles Yorke was twice married:
Firstly, on 19 May 1755 to Katherine Blount Freeman, with one son:
Philip Yorke, (31 May 175718 Nov 1834) became 3rd Earl of Hardwicke;
Secondly, on 30 December 1762 to Agneta Johnson, with children:
Charles Philip Yorke (12 Mar 176413 Mar 1834) was later to be prominent in government.
Caroline Yorke (29 Aug 176526 Jul 1818), who married John Eliot, 1st Earl of St Germans.
Joseph Sydney Yorke (6 Jun 17685 May 1831), who became an Admiral in the Royal Navy.

His wife was heiress to Tyttenhanger House, near St Albans, Hertfordshire.

References

Bibliography
Cannon, J. (1964) "Yorke, Charles", in L.Namier and J.Brooke (eds.) [1964](1985) The History of Parliament: The House of Commons, 1754–1790, vol.3 new ed., London:Secker & Warburg, 
— (2004) "Yorke, Charles (1722–1770)", Oxford Dictionary of National Biography, Oxford University Press, accessed 2 March 2008 . 

1722 births
1770 deaths
Younger sons of earls
People educated at Newcome's School
Alumni of Corpus Christi College, Cambridge
Members of the Parliament of Great Britain for English constituencies
Members of the Parliament of Great Britain for Cambridge University
British MPs 1747–1754
British MPs 1754–1761
British MPs 1761–1768
British MPs 1768–1774
Lord chancellors of Great Britain
British East India Company people
Charles
Fellows of the Royal Society